Oliver Hassler (born 4 January 1988) is a German Greco-Roman wrestler. He won the silver medal in the men's 98 kg event at the 2014 World Wrestling Championships held in Tashkent, Uzbekistan. In the final, he lost against Artur Aleksanyan of Armenia.

In 2019, he won one of the bronze medals in the men's 97 kg event at the Military World Games held in Wuhan, China.

Achievements

References

External links 
 

Living people
1988 births
Place of birth missing (living people)
German male sport wrestlers
World Wrestling Championships medalists
Wrestlers at the 2015 European Games
European Games competitors for Germany
21st-century German people